Morro de São Paulo Airport  is the airport serving Cairu, Brazil, located in the district of Morro de São Paulo.

Airlines and destinations

Access

See also

List of airports in Brazil

References

External links

Airports in Bahia